The US 13 Dragway is an IHRA sanctioned drag racing facility. It is located in Delmar, Delaware along with its sister track the Delaware International Speedway. The complex is one of Delaware's largest attractions.

External links 
 US 13 Dragway

NHRA Division 1 drag racing venues
Motorsport venues in Delaware
Buildings and structures in Sussex County, Delaware
Tourist attractions in Sussex County, Delaware